Stephen is a surname of English, Scottish, and German origin. It is a reasonably common surname. The German variant is thought to have originated from the German-speaking world as (Von) Stephan.

Stephen is the 3,845 most common surname in the USA.

MacStèaphain (Scottish Gaelic) Stephen is a sept of the clan MacTavish. It is believed that Stephens from North East Scotland (Morayshire, Banffshire, and Aberdeenshire) south of the Moray Firth are descended from a Viking named Tarben whose longship landed in Banffshire in the late 10th century CE. His name was Christianized to Stephen.

Notable people with the surname 
 Stephen (Australian legal family), a prominent legal dynasty, includes
 Sir Alfred Stephen (1802–1894), Chief Justice of New South Wales 
 George Milner Stephen (1812–1894), Australian politician and faith healer
 Harold Stephen MLA (1841–1889), Australian politician
 Sir Henry Stephen (Matthew Henry Stephen 1828–1920), Puisne Judge in New South Wales
 James Wilberforce Stephen (1822–1881), judge of the Victorian Supreme Court
 Montagu Stephen MLA (1827–1872), solicitor and politician
 Septimus Alfred Stephen MLC (1842–1901), solicitor and politician
 A. G. Stephen (1862–1924), Hong Kong banker
 Caroline Emelia Stephen (1834–1909), British philanthropist and writer on Quakerism 
 C. M. Stephen (1918–1984), Indian politician
 Elizabeth Willisson Stephen (1856-1925), American author
 George Stephen, 1st Baron Mount Stephen, Canadian businessman, financier, philanthropist
 George A. Stephen (c.1922–1993), American inventor and entrepreneur 
 Harry Lushington Stephen, judge, alderman, writer
 Hugh R. Stephen (1913–2002), mayor of Victoria, BC, Canada
 James Stephen (disambiguation), several people
James Stephen (architect) (1858–1938), American architect
James Stephen (British politician) (1758–1832), British abolitionist lawyer and Member of Parliament
Sir James Stephen (civil servant) (1789–1859), British under-secretary for the colonies, 1836–1847
Sir James Fitzjames Stephen (1829–1894), British judge and anti-libertarian writer
James Kenneth Stephen (1859–1892), English poet
 Jimmy Stephen (1922–2012), footballer
 Julia Stephen (1846–1895), English art model, wife of Leslie
 Leslie Stephen, English author, critic, historian, biographer, mountaineer, husband of Julia
 Marcus Stephen (born 1969), President of Nauru (2007–2011)
 Nicol Stephen, Scottish politician
 Ninian Stephen (1923–2017), Australian judge and Governor-General of Australia
 Norman Stephen (1865–1948), Scottish schoolmaster and cricketer
 Pamela Helen Stephen (1964–2021), English opera singer 
 Shamar Stephen, American football player
 Susan Stephen, English actor
 W. S. E. Stephen (died c. 1973), philatelist

See also
Stephen, given name

References 

Surnames from given names